Sir Arthur Francis Grimble,   (Hong Kong, 11 June 1888 – London, 13 December 1956) was  a British Colonial Service administrator and writer.

Biography

Grimble was educated at Chigwell School and Magdalene College, Cambridge. He then went to France and Germany for postgraduate studies. After joining the Colonial Office in 1914 he became the very first cadet administrative officer in the Gilbert and Ellice Islands. From April 1919 he acted as the Resident Commissioner until Herbert Reginald McClure took up his appointment as Resident Commissioner. In 1925 Grimble succeeded McClure as Resident Commissioner. He learned the Gilbertese language, and became a specialist in the myths and oral traditions of the Kiribati people. He remained in the islands until 1933. He has been the source of many people's impressions of the islands through his radio broadcast on BBC in the 1950s and his bestselling book A Pattern of Islands. 

Grimble later served as Governor of the Seychelles (1936–1942) and as Governor of the Windward Islands (1942–1948). He was knighted as a Knight Commander of the Order of St Michael and St George (KCMG) on 1 January 1930.

Literary career
After retiring and moving to Britain in 1948 Grimble became a writer and broadcaster. He wrote A Pattern of Islands (London, John Murray 1952, published in the United States as We Chose the Islands) and Return to the Islands (1957), both of which were bestsellers. Pacific Destiny, a film based on his experiences, was released in 1956. Grimble's scholarly work on Gilbertese culture is covered in Henry Evans Maude's book Tungaru Traditions: Writings on the Atoll Culture of the Gilbert Islands (Honolulu: University of Hawaii Press,  1989).

Heraldic artist
In 1931 Grimble designed the coat of arms of the British colony of the Gilbert and Ellice Islands, which was granted in 1937. The design has been retained for the flag of Kiribati.

References

1888 births
1956 deaths
British memoirists
British non-fiction writers
People educated at Chigwell School
Governors of British Seychelles
Governors of the Windward Islands
British male writers
Colonial Administrative Service officers
Governors of British Saint Vincent and the Grenadines
Governors of the Gilbert and Ellice Islands
Knights Commander of the Order of St Michael and St George
20th-century memoirists
Male non-fiction writers
British people in British Hong Kong